Yi jian mei (一剪梅) may refer to:

A Spray of Plum Blossoms, a 1931 Chinese film
One Plum Blossom, a 1984 Taiwanese TV series
Yi jian mei (song), a 1983 song by Fei Yu-ching which gained international popularity in 2020